Jineiry Martínez (born December 3, 1997, in Santo Domingo) is a Dominican volleyball player who played the 2015 FIVB World Cup with the Dominican Republic national team. She won the bronze medal in the 2015 Pan American Games. With her under ages national teams, she won the gold medal in the 2015 FIVB U20 World Championship, silver in the 2013 FIVB U23 World Championship and bronze in the 2015 FIVB U23 World Championship.

In club competitions, she played the 2015 FIVB Club World Championship with the Dominican club Mirador and the 2015–16 CEV Champions League with the French Rocheville Le Cannet.

Personal life
Her parents are Agripina Martínez, who also served as Dominican Republic youth and junior squads team manager, and Juan Doñe (deceased 2008). Her siblings are Brayelin who also plays for the Dominican Republic national volleyball teams and Brayan, who plays professional basketball with Titanes del Distrito Nacional. She is the cousin of basketball player Jack Michael Martínez and niece of the former national team basketball player and politician Vice-Minister of Sports Soterio Ramírez. She confessed that she never liked basketball, but felt in love with volleyball since childhood. She finds support in her sister Brayelin, who was her inspiration to play volleyball.

Career

2012-2013
Martinez played the 2012 High Performance Championships international junior division winning the silver medal when her team lost to the USA Junior team in the final match,
The Dominican Republic Youth National team moved to Tijuana, conquering the 2012 Youth NORCECA Championship silver medal. She won the gold medal at the 2012 Junior NORCECA Championship, qualifying for the 2013 Junior World Championship.

Martinez played in Guatemala where she won with her U-18 squad the 2013 Youth Pan-American Cup bronze medal match 3–1 to Argentina after losing 2–3 to Puerto Rico due to lack of concentration. During the Junior Pan-American Cup held in La Habana, Cuba, Martínez settled the silver medal when her junior team lost 1–3 to Mexico. She then played the FIVB U18 World Championship and ranked eight with her national team. and shortly afterwards played the FIVB U20 World Championship in June, also ranking eight with her national team. She won the silver medal in the 2013 FIVB U23 World Championship winning the silver medal after being defeated by China in the gold medal match.

2014
In March, Martinez joined the Dominican club Playeras from the Boca Chica municipality, joining her sister Brayelin and winning the local tournament after defeating the San Lorenzo de Los Mina club in the final series. They previously easyly defeated Villa Duarte in the semifinals. She later played the NORCECA Junior Championship helping her team to win the bronze medal and later joined the under 23 National Team that won the U23 Pan-American Cup and earning the Best Middle Blocker individual award tied with the Peruvian Andrea Urrutia.
 After the gold medal, she was among the athletes included in the Dominican Government program that support the new values by the Minister of Sports, Physical Education and Recreation.

2015
Martinez debuted with the Dominican Republic national senior team in Montreux, Switzerland during the Montreux Volley Masters having a team leading 14 points in the classification match for fifth place, including nine blocks. She then played the Junior Pan-American Cup in home soil, winning the gold medal and the qualification for the 2015 FIVB U23 World Championship and was awarded the second Best Middle Blocker of the tournament.

Martinez was chosen to play with the Dominican club Mirador as a wildcard in the FIVB Club World Championship
but the team fell 1–3 to Voléro Zürich and 0–3 to Rexona Ades Rio to end their participation in the fifth place. She then played the NORCECA Champions Cup, taking home the gold medal and the qualification for the 2015 FIVB World Cup She then played the 2015 Pan American Games in Toronto, Canada, winning the bronze medal. She took part in the FIVB U23 World Championship finishing with her team the first round undefeated before losing 2–3 to Brazil in the semifinals, she confessed that the team felt sorry about a match they would have won. She ended up winning the bronze medal after coming from behind 3–2 to Japan.

Back with her senior team in the World Cup, and after posting a 5–6 record, they finished in the seventh place from twelve teams.

In September, Martínez signed with the French club Rocheville Le Cannet, then traveled to Puerto Rico to take part in the 2015 U20 World Championship with her junior team who advanced to the semifinals without losing one game as they later won 3–2 over Italy in the semifinals. They then beat Brazil 3–2 to win the gold medal. After the game, Martínez credited the teamwork as the key element for they win.

Martínez senior team lost 1–3 to the United States the NORCECA Championship, ending their participation with the silver medal. Later, she was enrolled in October by the Japan Anti-Doping Agency to be part of the Play True 2020 Torch Relay project, where she was among many athletes aimed to leave real heritage in sport for the world and the future.

2017
With her national team, Martínez won the 2017 Bolivarian Games gold medal.

Clubs
  Mirador (2013)
  Boca Chica (2014)
  Mirador (2015)
  Rocheville Le Cannet (2015-2016)
  Praia Clube (2020–)

Awards

Individuals
 2014 U23 Pan-American Cup "Best Middle Blocker"
 2015 Junior Pan-American Cup "Best Middle Blocker"
 2019 Pan American Games "Best Middle Blockers"
 2021 Pan-American Cup "Best Middle Blocker"

Clubs
 2014 Santo Domingo Superior Tournament -  Champion, with Boca Chica
 2020–21 Brazilian Superliga –  Runner-Up, with Dentil/Praia Clube
 2021–22 Brazilian Superliga –  Runner-Up, with Dentil/Praia Clube

References

External links
 FIVB Profile
 French League Profile
 Volleybox Player Profile

1997 births
Living people
Dominican Republic women's volleyball players
Volleyball players at the 2015 Pan American Games
Pan American Games bronze medalists for the Dominican Republic
Pan American Games medalists in volleyball
Middle blockers
Expatriate volleyball players in France
Dominican Republic expatriates in France
Volleyball players at the 2019 Pan American Games
Medalists at the 2015 Pan American Games
Medalists at the 2019 Pan American Games
Volleyball players at the 2020 Summer Olympics
Olympic volleyball players of the Dominican Republic